USS Satilla (SP-687) was a United States Navy patrol vessel in commission from 1917 to 1919.

Construction and acquisition
Satilla was built as a private steam yacht of the same name by George Lawley & Son at Neponset, Massachusetts, in 1902. After the death of her owner, R. Hall McCormick of Chicago, Illinois, the State of Maine purchased her from McCormick's estate in May 1917 for the local use of the section patrol commander at Rockland, Maine. On 17 May 1917, the U.S. Navy purchased Satilla from the State of Maine for use as a section patrol boat during World War I. She began operating with the Maine Naval Militia on 24 May 1917, patrolling the Maine coast. The Navy commissioned  her as USS Saltilla (SP-687) on 31 May 1917 and she was enrolled in the Naval Coast Defense Reserve on 18 June 1917.

U.S. Navy service
Satilla carried out patrol duties off Rockland and Bath, Maine, for the rest of World War I, frequently lying to overnight at Cross Island, Winter Harbor, and Cutler Harbor. On 1 September 1917, she served as one of the escorts for the new destroyer USS Manley (Destroyer No. 74) during Manleys sea trials off Bath.

While lying alongside the Hodge Boiler Works pier at Boston in mid-1918, Satilla was accidentally rammed by the minesweeper  and suffered considerable damage. Although her hull was buckled in on the port side and leaking, she was repaired over the next few months and returned to duty, although not until after the end of World War I.

Disposal and later career
Satilla steamed to Boston, Massachusetts, on 19 September 1919, where she was placed in the custody of the Commandant, 1st Naval District. Stricken from the Navy List on 7 November 1919, Satilla was sold on 25 March 1920 to Oscar L. Ledberg of Providence, Rhode Island. Ledberg renamed her Edith, and used her as a yacht until 1927, when he sold her to Captain William Baletti of Hoboken, New Jersey. Baletti employed her thereafter as a fishing boat.

References

Department of the Navy Naval History and Heritage Command Online Library of Selected Images: U.S. Navy Ships: USS Satilla (SP-687), 1917-1920. Previously the civilian steam yacht Satilla.
NavSource Online: Section Patrol Craft Photo Archive Satilla (SP 687)

Patrol vessels of the United States Navy
World War I patrol vessels of the United States
Ships built in Boston
1902 ships
Individual yachts
Maritime incidents in 1918